Gerra may refer to:

Gerra (Gambarogno), Ticino, Switzerland
Gerra (Verzasca), Ticino, Switzerland
Gerra (god), Babylonian and Akkadian god of fire
 Gerra (moth), a moth genus
Gerrha or Gerra, ancient city in Arabia

See also
 Gera (disambiguation)
 Ghera (disambiguation)